Two ships of the Polish Navy have borne the name ORP Krakowiak: 
, was a torpedo boat
, was a  launched as HMS Silverton for the Royal Navy and transferred in 1941.  She was returned in 1946.

Polish Navy ship names